Vlado & Isolda was a pop duo that represented Yugoslavia at the Eurovision Song Contest 1984 with the song "Ciao, amore".

The duo consisted of Croatian and Serbian pop singers, Vlado Kalember and Izolda Barudžija, respectively.  The latter had appeared as a singer or back-up singer in two previous contests, her most famous appearance being the 1983 entry "Džuli".

References

Yugoslav singers
Eurovision Song Contest entrants for Yugoslavia
Eurovision Song Contest entrants of 1984